Fred McGinis (11 November 1874 – 30 March 1953) was an Australian rules footballer who played for the Melbourne Football Club in the Victorian Football Association (VFA) and the Victorian Football League (VFL).

Family
The son of Louis McGuiness (1841-1908), and Mary Ann McGuiness (1840-1911), née Toogood, Alfred Ernest McGuiness was born at Hobart on 11 November 1874.

Football
McGinis began his career with Melbourne at the age of nineteen in 1894 in the VFA, and was its leading goalkicker in 1895.

A rover, he starred for Melbourne in its debut season in the VFL in 1897. 

He was a premiership player with Melbourne in 1900.

Vision difficulties
Vision difficulties forced him out of the game by 1902 and he returned to Tasmania.

Benefit matches
As he neared total blindness, a match was played for his benefit between combined teams from the VFA and VFL on 4 September 1902; the match, won by the VFL, raised £200. The match was the first time that the two bitter rival football competitions had ever played against each other.

Death
He died in Hobart on 30 March 1953, and was cremated at the Cornelian Bay Cemetery the next day.

Hall of Fame
McGinis was regarded as one of the best players of his era, with some contemporaries, including Mick Grace, Jack Leith, George Cathie, and the Argus sportswriter 'Observer' naming him as the best overall.

Although primarily a rover, he could play and succeed at any position on the ground, and was proficient at all skills: accurate kicking, high marking, speed and endurance.
In all my experience I have never seen a more accomplished player – one qualified to rank on the hlghest rung of the ladder of fame among the football champions of Australia. His scintillating brilliancy on the field was unfortunately cut short at the height of his fame by failing eye-sight. (George Cathie, 1943).

McGinis is the first listed inductee in the Tasmanian Football Hall of Fame, his citation describing him as "Tasmania's first true football superstar".

See also
 The Footballers' Alphabet

Footnotes

References
 'Follower', "The Footballers' Alphabet", The Leader, (Saturday, 23 July 1898), p. 17.
 Holmesby, Russell and Main, Jim (2007). The Encyclopedia of AFL Footballers. 7th ed. Melbourne: Bas Publishing.

External links

 Demonwiki: Fred McGinis.
 Boyles Football Photos: Fred McGinis.

1874 births
1953 deaths
Australian Rules footballers: place kick exponents
Melbourne Football Club players
Tasmanian Football Hall of Fame inductees
Australian rules footballers from Hobart
Melbourne Football Club (VFA) players
Melbourne Football Club Premiership players
One-time VFL/AFL Premiership players